KBTO is a Country formatted broadcast radio station licensed to Bottineau, North Dakota, serving North-Central North Dakota.  KBTO is owned and operated by Programmer's Broadcasting.

Public service
Notable public service efforts have included "Are You Tough Enough to Wear Pink?", a 2007 campaign rallying the rodeo and western industry to raise money and awareness for breast cancer treatment and research. The campaign ultimately raised over $26,000 for a new cancer exercise rehabilitation center at the Minot Family YMCA.

References

External links
 Sunny 101.9 Online
 

1980 establishments in North Dakota
Country radio stations in the United States
Radio stations established in 1980
BTO